Mentuhotep was an ancient Egyptian queen of the Second Intermediate Period, wife of pharaoh Djehuti. Her main title was Great Royal Wife. Another title was Khenemetneferhedjet (she who is united with the white crown).

Attestation 
Queen Mentuhotep is known from parts of her burial equipment found between 1822 and 1825 near Thebes at Dra' Abu el-Naga' by the Italian excavator Giuseppe Passalacqua. He found a canopic chest with cosmetic boxes. The objects were later sold to Berlin. Around 1832 John Gardner Wilkinson copied inscriptions of a coffin naming a queen with the same name. The original coffin is now lost. On the coffin it is stated that she was the daughter of the vizier Senebhenaf and of a woman called Sobekhotep. The inside of the coffin was decorated with different spells, many of them belong to the Egyptian Book of the Dead. Her coffin is one of the earliest sources for this funerary composition. It is not fully clear whether the coffin and the canopic chest were found in the same tomb. Giuseppe Passalacqua described the tomb and mentions an anthropoid coffin richly decorated with figures of deities. However, the coffin copied by Wilkinson is rectangular and not decorated with figures of gods. Therefore, Herbert E. Winlock, looking at the evidence concluded that there were two queens with the name Mentuhotep. One was the wife of king Djehuti, the other one is known from her coffin. With the cosmetic box were found some other objects, including several alabaster vessels. However, these vessels belong according to their type to the 25th Dynasty.

Cosmetic Box 
The canopic chest was given to queen Mentuhotep by king Djehuti, as indicated in a dedication inscribed on the box. The original canopic chest is inscribed for the king. Inside of it were found two cosmetic boxes, made of wood and papyrus. They are now on display in the Neues Museum of Berlin, with catalog number AM 1176-1182. Inside the box were found alabaster vessels and a cosmetic spoon. The canopic chest is in Berlin too and has the number 1175.

References 

17th-century BC women
Queens consort of the Sixteenth Dynasty of Egypt
Egyptological objects of the Berlin State Museums